A formula may be derived mathematically for the rate of scattering when a beam of electrons passes through a material.

The interaction picture

The eigenstates of the unperturbed Hamiltonian are assumed to be

In the interaction picture, the state ket is defined by

By a Schrödinger equation, we see 

Solving the differential equation, we can find the coefficient of n-state.

where, the zeroth-order term and first-order term are

The transition rate
The probability of finding  is found by evaluating .

In case of constant perturbation, is calculated by 

Using the equation which is

The transition rate of an electron from the initial state  to final state  is given by

The scattering rate
The scattering rate w(k) is determined by summing all the possible finite states k' of electron scattering from an initial state k to a final state k', and is defined by

The integral form is

References

Semiconductor technology